Holendry may refer to the following places:
Holendry, Łódź Voivodeship (central Poland)
Holendry, Lublin Voivodeship (east Poland)
Holendry, Gmina Chmielnik in Świętokrzyskie Voivodeship (south-central Poland)
Holendry, Gmina Pierzchnica in Świętokrzyskie Voivodeship (south-central Poland)
Holendry, Masovian Voivodeship (east-central Poland)

It may also refer to a village organized under a particular form of law.  See Olędrzy